Jim Hall (10 March 1919 – 29 August 2006) was an Australian rules footballer who played with St Kilda in the Victorian Football League (VFL). A rover, Hall was St Kilda's joint leading goal-kicker in 1945, with 21 goals. He had bettered that tally the previous year, when he kicked 24 goals, but he finished second in the goal-kicking behind Sam Loxton. Hall continued his career at Oakleigh, his original club, in 1946.

References

1919 births
2006 deaths
Australian rules footballers from Victoria (Australia)
St Kilda Football Club players
Oakleigh Football Club players